Psilothrips is a genus of thrips in the family Thripidae. There are at least two described species in Psilothrips.

Species
These two species belong to the genus Psilothrips.
 Psilothrips pardalotus Hood, 1927
 Psilothrips priesneri (Moulton, 1926)

References

Further reading

External links

 

Thripidae